Nuevo Mirandilla is a football stadium in Cádiz, Spain. The stadium is the home ground of Cádiz CF. The stadium was originally inaugurated as Estadio Ramón de Carranza on 3 September 1955. It has since then been completely rebuilt twice. With a capacity of 20,724 seats, it is the 24th-largest stadium in Spain and the 5th-largest in Andalusia.

History
The stadium was inaugurated 3 September 1955. A month earlier on 6 August the national flag was raised at the stadium in the presence of José León de Carranza (mayor of the city), Cazalla Morales (responsible for the work), the architects in charge (Muñoz Monasterio and Fernández Pujol) and the president and the vice president of Cádiz CF (Juan Ramón Cilleruelo Montero and Rafael García Serrano). With a total of 15,000 spectators, the stadium built with an oval shape included a 400-metre athletics track between the pitch and the stands. The inaugural match was played against FC Barcelona, that ended in a loss of 0–4. With two goals from Villaverde, then Luis Suárez then a final goal from Kubala.

The first rebuilding of the stadium took place in 1984, over the course of 4 months the main stand was demolished and rebuilt and the other stands were redesigned, at the same time the athletics track was removed and the pitch was moved closer to the stands. The rebuilt stadium included a roof over the main stand. The stadium capacity after the first rebuilding was 23,000. On 8 February 2002, the mayor of the city, Teófila Martínez, presented the first real project for the New Carranza. One of its key points was the enlargement of the commercial areas in the stadium, which total surface was estimated at 5,000 square meter.

The second rebuilding of the stadium took place between 2003 and 2012 when all four stands were demolished and rebuilt starting with the south stand (Fondo Sur) and the east stand (Preferente) between 2003 and 2005. Then the north stand (Fondo Norte) was rebuilt between 2006 and 2008. The last stand to be rebuilt was the main stand (Tribuna) which is the largest one with 8,281 seats and thus far the only one with a roof, the construction took place between 2009 and 2012.

The new stadium with a capacity of 20,724 spectators has a total built up area of 94,938 square metres, it includes 31,555 m of underground parking for around 900 cars under the four stands, commercial areas located throughout the stadium totaling 23,349 m, and 28,714 m are used for a hotel located in the main stand. The total cost of the rebuilding was €68 million, all paid for with public funds. The Spain national football team for the first time played an official match on the Ramón de Carranza against Malta in UEFA Euro 2020 qualifying on 15 November 2019. The game ended with a 7:0 Spain victory.

Access
Nuevo Mirandilla is easily accessible by public transport.

By train

 The stadium has a nearby train station (estación de Estadio) where all commuter trains on the Cádiz-Jerez line stops, some regional trains on the Cádiz-Seville line also stops at the stadium station.

By bus

 Three city bus routes link up with the stadium, route 1 in front of the stadium at Avenida León de Carranza, route 2 stops in the Barriada de Loreto neighborhood close the stadium and route 5 stops at Avenida de la Sanidad Pública a short walk from the stadium.

References

External links

Ramón de Carranza Stadium
More information about Ramón de Carranza Stadium in «Portal 
Estadios de Espana 

Football venues in Andalusia
Cádiz CF
Buildings and structures in the Province of Cádiz
Sports venues completed in 1955
1955 establishments in Spain
Sport in Cádiz